Ónavas is a small town surrounded by  Onavas Municipality in the southeast of the Mexican state of Sonora.

History
The name Ónavas comes from the Cahita language and means salty water.

Climate

It was founded in 1622 by two Jesuit missionaries: Diego Vandersipe and Blas Paredes.

Economic activity
Agriculture covered 2,227 hectares (2000), most of which were not irrigated.  Main crops are  alfalfa, beans, corn and the production of fodder for the cattle industry. Sonora Turismo 

Cattle raising was carried out by sixty percent of the work force (2000) and there were 6,614 head of cattle. Sonora Turismo

References
 Enciclopedia de los Municipios de México
 INEGI

Notes

External links
 Pueblos de Sonora article on Onavas
 Gobierno de Sonora

Populated places in Sonora
1622 establishments in the Spanish Empire